David Biele is a State Representative who represents the 4th Suffolk District in the Massachusetts House of Representatives. He represents several districts in Boston. Biele serves on the Joint Committee on Community Development and Small Businesses, the Joint Committee on Economic Development and Emerging Technologies, the Joint Committee on Export Development, and the Joint Committee on State Administration and Regulatory Oversight.

See also
 2019–2020 Massachusetts legislature
 2021–2022 Massachusetts legislature

References

Living people
21st-century American politicians
Democratic Party members of the Massachusetts House of Representatives
Boston College alumni
Year of birth missing (living people)